Umai is a popular traditional native dish of the Melanau people in Sarawak, Malaysia, which is usually eaten by fishermen. Umai is a dish of sliced raw fish with a mixture of onions, chillies, vinegar, salt and lime juice.

The Malaysia Book of Records
In 2012, a 170.3 meter umai prepared during 'Masihkah Kau Ingat' carnival in Dalat was certified as the "longest umai" ever prepared.

See also 
 Hinava
 Ceviche
 Kinilaw
 List of raw fish dishes

References 

Malaysian cuisine
Uncooked fish dishes